Vladimir Lazić (born 11 Septembar 1988), is a Serbian futsal player who plays for Novi Beograd and the Serbia national futsal team.

References

External links

1984 births
Living people
Serbian men's futsal players